Schefflera digitata, the patē, seven-finger, or umbrella tree, is a tree endemic to  New Zealand belonging to the family Araliaceae. Māori names include: patē, patatē, patete, and kōtētē. It occurs in lowland to lower montane forests from sea level to 1200 m in the North Island, South Island, and Stewart Island, covering a latitudinal range from 34°S to 47°S. It prefers damp, shady parts of the forest and is common along stream banks and on shady forest roadsides. It is the only New Zealand representative of the genus Schefflera, which has 12 other species on the Pacific islands.

Description
 Patē is a small, spreading tree up to 8 m high with stout branches. The leaves may have from three to nine leaflets. The leaflets are thin and soft to the touch with sharply serrated margins. In the north of the North Island, S. digitata has a juvenile stage in which the leaflets are divided into irregular toothed lobes. The inflorescence is a large, multi-branched panicle up to 35 cm across, with umbels of small greenish flowers arising at irregular intervals along its length. Each umbel contains up to ten flowers each about 7 mm in diameter. The dark violet fruits are fleshy, round, and grooved when dry. They are about 3.5 mm in diameter and take two or three months to ripen.

Ecology and uses
The sap of the tree has medicinal uses, and has been used to treat ringworm and sores on the skin. The wood was used by Māori to make fire by friction. Patē is the most common host of the parasitic plant Dactylanthus taylori. This is a root parasite that was known to the Māori as pua-o-te-reinga, 'the flower of the underworld'. Wood rose is threatened with extinction, which is thought to be due to several factors including the poaching of plants for sale as curios. Although patē is easy to grow in New Zealand, it is not popular in cultivation, as its thin, soft foliage cannot match the glossy attractiveness of the similar Pseudopanax species, nor that of the Australian species Heptapleurum actinophyllum, which is also easy to grow in the North Island. S. digitata is sometimes grown by Northern Hemisphere gardeners thinking it may be relatively hardy, but like many New Zealand trees, patē is not tolerant of prolonged cold conditions.

References

Salmon J T, The Native Trees of New Zealand, AH & AW Reed Ltd, Wellington, New Zealand 1973

External links

digitata
Trees of New Zealand
Ornamental trees
Trees of mild maritime climate